Jarosław Tkocz (born 25 February 1973 in Rybnik) is a Polish former footballer who played as a goalkeeper. He currently serves as a goalkeeping coach for Ekstraklasa side Korona Kielce.

References

1973 births
People from Rybnik
Living people
Polish footballers
GKS Katowice players
FC Shinnik Yaroslavl players
FC Ural Yekaterinburg players
Ekstraklasa players
Russian Premier League players
Polish expatriate footballers
Expatriate footballers in Russia
Sportspeople from Silesian Voivodeship
Association football goalkeepers